The Danish Academy of Digital, Interactive Entertainment (Danish: Det Danske Akademi for Digital, Interaktiv Underholdning), or DADIU, is a collaborative enterprise between different educational institutions offering a specialization in creating computer games. The secretariat is based at the National Film School of Denmark at Holmen in Copenhagen.

Program
The program covers one semester (September–December). January is allocated for evaluation, optional reports and examinations at the local institution.

Collaborators
The collaborating institutions are:
 National Film School of Denmark
 TRUEMAX Academy
 Animation Workshop, VIA University College
 Danish Design School
 IT University of Copenhagen
 Technical University of Denmark
 University of Copenhagen
 Aalborg University
 Aarhus University

References

External links
 Official website

Educational organizations based in Denmark